The Specialist is a 1975 American thriller film directed by Howard Avedis and written by Ralph B. Potts, Howard Avedis and Marlene Schmidt. The film stars Adam West, John Anderson, Ahna Capri, Harvey Jason, Alvy Moore and Marlene Schmidt. The film was released in May 1975, by Crown International Pictures.

Plot
When Pike Smith (John Anderson), a corrupt attorney for a California Water Company, is replaced by the flashy Jerry Bounds (Adam West), he hires Londa Wyeth (Ahna Capri), a voluptuous woman, to seduce Bounds and pose as a jury member so he can be disbarred from the profession.

Cast      
Adam West as Jerry Bounds
John Anderson as Pike Smith
Ahna Capri as Londa Wyeth
Harvey Jason as Hardin Smith
Alvy Moore as Bailiff Humbolt
Marlene Schmidt as Elizabeth Bounds
Howard Avedis as Alec Sharkey 
Charles Knapp as Judge Davis
Chuck Boyd as Arthur Farley
Robert Shayne as Chairman Hopkins
Christiane Schmidtmer as Nude Model

References

External links
 

1975 films
American thriller films
1970s thriller films
Crown International Pictures films
1970s English-language films
1970s American films